Marcus Pedersen (born 8 June 1990) is a Norwegian professional footballer who plays as a forward for HamKam.

Club career

HamKam 
Pedersen was born in Hamar, Norway. He grew up in the nearby Stange, where he played youth football until he joined HamKam at age 11.

He played in his first senior match for HamKam at the age of 14, in a friendly game. In the spring of 2006, he was invited to a trial with Liverpool, but failed to impress, which Pedersen later attributed to an attack of mononucleosis that was identified after he returned home.

In 2007, he was part of the HamKam squad that was promoted to Tippeligaen. He made his debut for HamKam against Skeid on 9 April 2007, and featured in three other matches that season. He made his Tippeliga debut, and scored his first professional goal in the 2–1 victory against Rosenborg on 9 July 2008, making him the match winner. Injuries prevented him of getting more than five games in his second senior season.

Strømsgodset 
On 1 January 2009 Pedersen signed for Strømsgodset on a free transfer, after his contract with HamKam ended. He cited the need for a change in surroundings as part of why he signed for a new club. He played his first match in Tippeligaen for Strømsgodset on 15 March 2009 against Start. The match ended 3–3 in with Pedersen scoring two of the goals. He scored another two goals on 2 June 2009 in a 2–1 victory against Brann. Altogether, he scored 10 goals in 24 matches in the 2009 season, making him the top goal scorer for his club that year.

The 2010 season started very well for Pedersen. Playing alongside another young talent, Jo Inge Berget helped Pedersen to score seven goals 16 matches in 2010, and was second on the top-scorer list in Tippeligaen. He suffered an injury during a game a few weeks before the transfer-windows closed, and a transfer seemed unlikely, until Vitesse showed concrete interest in him.

Vitesse 
On 30 August 2010, he was sold from Strømsgodset to Vitesse Arnhem for about 12 million NOK, and signed a 4-year contract with the club. Only six weeks later, Vitesse manager Theo Bos was sacked, and was replaced by Albert Ferrer. Pedersen made his debut for the club on 24 October 2010, in the 4–1 defeat against Utrect. He scored his first goal only two minutes after coming on as a substitute. In the next match, on 14 November 2010, he scored two goals for Vitesse in a 5–1 victory over Venlo. He played a total of 16 league matches and scored five goals for the club in his first season, but featured only five times in the starting lineup. Vitesse barely avoided relegation in the 2010–11 Eredivisie and manager Albert Ferrer was replaced by John van den Brom. The new manager did not give Pedersen many chances in the 2011–12 Eredivisie. While Vitesse secured a UEFA Europa League, Pedersen only played four matches from the start, and came on as a substitute five times. He failed to score any goals.

Vålerenga 
Having struggled with various injuries, Pedersen found it difficult to hold down a spot in Vitesse's starting eleven. He was subsequently sent on loan to Norwegian club Vålerenga on 22 February 2012, and managed 8 goals in 15 league appearances until the loan-deal ended on 1 August. On 21 August 2012, he was fined by the Football Association of Norway for making homophobic remarks towards Stabæk supporters 22 July 2012.

Odense 
On 31 August 2012, Pedersen was loaned out to Odense Boldklub on a season-long loan deal, with OB having an option to buy. He made his debut against F.C. Copenhagen on 2 September 2012.

Barnsley 
On 21 August 2013, Pedersen joined English Championship club Barnsley on a season-long loan.

Brann 
On 11 August 2014, Pedersen was sold to Brann for an undisclosed sum, partly financed by investor Trond Mohn. He scored three goals in ten league matches for the club, but was unable to save them from relegation.

Pedersen had a gentleman's agreement with the former sports director of Brann, Roald Bruun-Hansen, that he would be sold if the club was relegated. However, the interim director Rune Soltvedt informed the striker that he was to be part of the club's plans for winning promotion the next season. During pre-season, on 4 February 2015, Pedersen tore his posterior cruciate ligament, and was injured for over three months, not playing again until 26 May 2015. He then went on to score three goals in his final eight league matches for the club.

Strømsgodset 
On 13 August 2015, Brann sold Pedersen to Strømsgodset for 2 million NOK. He made his comeback debut for the club in the 2–1 away defeat against Aalesund on 14 August 2015. He scored a hat-trick against local rivals Mjøndalen IF in a 4–2 away win on 30 August 2015.

He finished his first season having scored 11 goals in ten matches, helping his team secure the runner-up position in the 2015 Tippeligaen.

On 3 June 2020, Pedersen returned to former club HamKam. After a spell in Turkish clubs Ankaraspor and Tuzlaspor, Pedersen returned again to former club HamKam on 11 August 2022.

International career
Pedersen represented Norway at youth level from U15 to U23. He played his first match for the U21 side in August 2009, and he scored two goals for Norway U21 in the match against Hungary U21 on 28 May 2010.

Pedersen made his debut for Norway in the friendly match against South Africa on 8 January 2013, and started the match against Zambia four days later.

He returned to the national team on 12 November 2015, coming on as a substitute in the 61st minute in Norway's 1–0 defeat to Hungary in the first leg of the UEFA Euro 2016 qualifying play-offs.

Career statistics

Club

International goals
Scores and results list Norway's goal tally first, score column indicates score after each Pedersen goal.

References

External links
  
 Marcus Pedersen profile at Altomfotball.no

1990 births
Living people
Sportspeople from Hamar
Norwegian footballers
Association football forwards
Norway youth international footballers
Norway under-21 international footballers
Norway international footballers
Hamarkameratene players
Strømsgodset Toppfotball players
SBV Vitesse players
Vålerenga Fotball players
Odense Boldklub players
Barnsley F.C. players
SK Brann players
Ankaraspor footballers
Tuzlaspor players
Eliteserien players
Eredivisie players
Danish Superliga players
Norwegian First Division players
TFF First League players
Norwegian expatriate footballers
Norwegian expatriate sportspeople in the Netherlands
Expatriate footballers in the Netherlands
Norwegian expatriate sportspeople in Denmark
Expatriate men's footballers in Denmark
Norwegian expatriate sportspeople in Turkey
Expatriate footballers in Turkey
Norwegian expatriate sportspeople in England
Expatriate footballers in England